Kfir Zokol (born 31 July 1982) is a retired Ethiopian-born Israeli footballer.

Career
Kfir made his debut for the senior side of Maccabi Netanya in the end of the 1999–00 season. At the start of the 2000-01 season he suffered a serious knee injury from a nasty tackle by Joško Bilić. He missed the entire season after he had to go through surgery.
His breakthrough season came in 2002-03 when he was an important part of the successful season Netanya had. In the end of the season he won a cap for the Israel U-21 team and it seemed he was on his way to the top of Israeli football. In the middle of the 2003-04 season Kfir suffered  another injury and after that got loaned to teams from the lower divisions until he was released from his contract in Netanya. By most supporters of Netanya he is still regarded as one of the most talented players to never fulfil his full potential.

In 4 seasons with Netanya he managed to play 79 games, score 10 goals and also provided 2 assists in all club competitions.

Honours
Liga Alef - Northern Division (1):
2007-08

References

External links
Profile at One

Recent interview at Double Pass

1982 births
Living people
Ethiopian Jews
Ethiopian emigrants to Israel
Citizens of Israel through Law of Return
Israeli Jews
Israeli footballers
Maccabi Netanya F.C. players
Hapoel Nof HaGalil F.C. players
Hapoel Rishon LeZion F.C. players
Hapoel Jerusalem F.C. players
Beitar Tel Aviv Bat Yam F.C. players
Hapoel Umm al-Fahm F.C. players
Maccabi Shlomi Nahariya F.C. players
Maccabi Kafr Kanna F.C. players
Hapoel Hadera F.C. players
Ahva Arraba F.C. players
Israeli Premier League players
Liga Leumit players
Footballers from Netanya
Association football midfielders